Paramount Resources Ltd. is a Canadian petroleum company, founded in 1976. The company is involved in the exploration, development, production, processing, transportation and marketing of natural gas and its byproducts and crude oil. The company was founded by Clay Riddell.

In addition to its own name, Paramount has several subsidiaries with names resembling those of Hollywood companies, including Fox Drilling, Summit Resources, and Pixar Petroleum. It also retains significant investment in MGM Energy, which it spun off in 2007.

In 2017, Paramount acquired Apache Canada Ltd. for C$459.5 million and merged with Trilogy Energy Corp which itself was originally spun-off from Paramount.

Paramount reported an output of 85,941 barrels of oil equivalent per day (BOE/D) in its 2018 annual report, published in March 2019.

References

External links

Companies listed on the Toronto Stock Exchange
Oil companies of Canada
Companies based in Calgary
Non-renewable resource companies established in 1976
1976 establishments in Alberta